Rudno  is a village in the administrative district of Gmina Rudziniec, within Gliwice County, Silesian Voivodeship, in southern Poland.

The village has a population of 1,064.

References

Rudno